The FIS Ski Flying World Championships 2016 was held between 15 and 17 January 2016 in Tauplitz/Bad Mitterndorf, Austria for the fifth time. Kulm hosted the event previously in 1975, 1986, 1996 and 2006. The individual defending champion was Severin Freund.

Peter Prevc from Slovenia became new ski flying individual world champion after three rounds of competition with two of them were new hill records. Fourth round was cancelled due to wind conditions. Norway won the team event in front of Germany with a record margin of 110,4 points, while Austria came in third.

Schedule

Results

Qualifying

Trial rounds 

*team trial cancelled after Klemens Murańka, heavy snow.

Competition

Individual

Team

External links
Official website 

FIS Ski Flying World Championships
2016 in ski jumping
2016 in Austrian sport
Skiing competitions in Austria
International sports competitions hosted by Austria
Sport in Styria
January 2016 sports events in Europe